Islampur (City of Islam) may refer to:

Bangladesh
 Islampur Upazila, a subdistrict of Jamalpur, Bangladesh
 Islampur, a Union Parishad of Kamalganj Upazila, Moulvibazar District, Bangladesh
 Islampur, Jagannathpur, a village in Syedpur-Shaharpara Union Parishad, Jagannathpur Upazila, Sunamganj District
 Islampur is a place located in the southern district of Dhaka city.

India
 Islampur, Nalanda, a town in Nalanda district, Bihar, India
 Uran Islampur, a city in Sangli district, Maharashtra, India
 Islampur (Maharashtra) (Vidhan Sabha constituency), Sangli district, Maharashtra, India
 Islampur, Murshidabad, a census town in Murshidabad district, West Bengal, India
 Islampur, Uttar Dinajpur, a town in Uttar Dinajpur district, West Bengal, India
 Islampur subdivision in Uttar Dinajpur district, West Bengal, India
 Islampur, Uttar Dinajpur (community development block), Uttar Dinajpur district, West Bengal, India
 Islampur, Uttar Dinajpur (Vidhan Sabha constituency), Uttar Dinajpur district, West Bengal, India

See also
 Uran Islampur, a town in Sangli district, Maharashtra, India 

vi:Islampur